Edmondo is an Italian masculine given name. Its meaning is "wealthy guardian". Persons with the name include:

 Edmondo Amati (1920–2002), Italian film producer
 Edmondo De Amicis (1846–1908), Italian writer and journalist
 Edmondo Bacci (1913–1978), Italian painter 
 Edmondo Ballotta (born 1930), Italian pole vaulter 
 Edmondo Cirielli (born 1964), Italian politician
 Edmondo Fabbri (1921–1995), Italian football player and coach
 Edmondo Lorenzini (1937–2020), Italian football player
 Edmondo Lupieri (born 1950), Italian scholar
 Edmondo Mingione (born 1952), Italian former swimmer
 Edmondo Mornese (1910–1962), Italian football player
 Edmondo Rabanser (1936–2016), Italian ice hockey player
 Edmondo Rossoni (1884–1965), Italian politician
 Edmondo Sanjust di Teulada (1858–1936), Italian engineer and politician
 Edmondo Tieghi (born 1930), Italian actor
 Edmondo Della Valle (1904–1976), Italian football player
 Edmondo Zacchini (1894–1981), Italian circus entertainer

References

Italian masculine given names